The Quetta Gladiators is a franchise cricket team that represents Quetta in Pakistan Super League (PSL). It was one of the six teams that competed in the 2021 season. The team was coached by Moin Khan, and captained by Sarfaraz Ahmed, where Umar Gul was a bowling coach.

Season standings

Points table

League fixtures

References 

2022 in Balochistan, Pakistan
2021 Pakistan Super League
Gladiators in 2021
2021